Rhytiphora argus is a species of beetle in the family Cerambycidae. It was described by Francis Polkinghorne Pascoe in 1867. It is known from Australia.

References

argus
Beetles described in 1867